Cricocosmia is a genus of palaeoscolecid worm from the Early Cambrian Chengjiang biota.

Fossils of prehistoric  Cricocosmia species were found in the Cambrian period Maotianshan Shale geologic formation in China.

See also

References

Maotianshan shales fossils
Cambrian animals of Asia
Fossils of China
Prehistoric protostome genera

Cambrian genus extinctions